Hao Haidong (born 9 May 1970) is a Chinese former international footballer. He currently holds the record for being China's top goalscorer.

As a player he represented Bayi Football Team, Dalian Shide and Sheffield United in a career that saw him win six league titles and two Chinese FA Cup. Along with a Chinese Football Association Player of the Year award and three Chinese Jia-A League Top goalscorer awards. Since retiring he had a brief spell at management with Dalian Shide and was the General manager at Hunan Shoking before being Chairman of Tianjin Songjiang, which he left in 2012. Hao married former badminton champion Ye Zhaoying in summer 2019.

Club career

Bayi Football Team
Hao Haidong would make a name for himself by rising through the ranks with Bayi Football Team. On 31 July 1994, Hao was involved in an on-the-pitch brawl with Craig Allardyce, son of former English manager Sam Allardyce, in Bayi's league match with Guangdong Winnerway. This resulted in Hao and Allardyce receiving a half-year ban by the Chinese Football Association and thus Hao was not allowed to play for the Chinese national team in the 1994 Asian Games. While his personal performances with Bayi remained impressive, the team were not genuine title contenders anymore due to the club's struggles with professionalism and a requirement that all their players remain active People's Liberation Army members. With a significantly improved salary and a chance to win more silverware he would transfer to reigning league champions Dalian Shide at the beginning of the 1997 league season for a club record fee of 2,200,000 yuan at the time.

Dalian Shide 
His move to Dalian Shide would be a huge success and he would win the league title and Chinese FA Super Cup as well as also personally winning the Golden Boot and Golden Ball award in the 1997 season. The following season, Hao would continue to add to his medal collection with another league title and more personal awards while barely losing the Asian Club Championship as well. While Hao would be applauded for his football achievements and was even starting to be known as the "Chinese Alan Shearer", he would also show a darker aspect of his game after being fined for attacking a player on 15 March 1998 and was suspended for two games. This would also be followed by a year suspension by the Asian Football Confederation for spitting at a referee during the Asian Cup Winners' Cup. Due to the suspension, Hao would miss out on much of the 1999 league season, however this wouldn't hinder him at all and his prolific goalscoring would continue to see him win several more league titles, the Chinese FA Cup and the Asian Cup Winners' Cup runners-up medal. His stature within Dalian Shide would be so high that when then manager Milorad Kosanović left the club, Hao was immediately brought in as a caretaker to manage the team during the absence of a full-time manager.

Sheffield United
In January 2005, Hao was nearing the end of his career and received the chance to play abroad as English Championship side Sheffield United were increasingly interested in gaining access to a potentially lucrative footballing market and saw Hao as a symbolic first step in achieving this. Dalian Shide would release him as a gesture of goodwill following his record of good service towards the club and Sheffield United decided to make the transfer symbolic when Hao joined them for a record low transfer fee at the time by signing for £1 in 2005. In January 2005, Hao joined Sheffield United where he suffered from injuries and worked mainly as a coach in Sheffield's academy. His only appearance came as a substitute in the 2005–06 FA Cup on 7 January 2006 in a 2–1 loss against Colchester United. With no further opportunities, Hao retired and returned to China.

International career
Hao enjoyed a stellar international career by playing at the 2002 FIFA World Cup and is the record top goalscorer with 41 goals for the Chinese national team. Although China never made progress into Asia’s final qualifying round 2006 (finished behind Kuwait), Hao led his country in a bid to reach Germany. Hao is considered to be the best striker from China in the past two decades.

Personal life
With his ex-wife Chen Yi, Hao has a son, Runze Hao, who is also a professional football player, and a daughter named Hao Runhan (郝润涵). Hao married former badminton champion Ye Zhaoying in summer 2019.

Political views 
On 4 June 2020, on the 31st anniversary of the 1989 Tiananmen Square protests, Hao Haidong and his wife Ye Zhaoying publicly denounced the Chinese Communist Party, including for its mishandling of professional sports, Tibet, Hong Kong, and the COVID-19 pandemic.  "Football in China is a reflection of the country ... it's not the players that make it worse, it's the bureaucrats that damage the whole business by ignoring the rules", they said. They advocated the formation of a "New Federal State of China", a proposal supported by Chinese dissident Miles Kwok and American political strategist Steve Bannon. In response, the Chinese Communist Party first issued statements harshly criticizing Hao and Ye, and then altered course to expunge all references to them from the Chinese-accessible internet—the Weibo accounts of Hao and Ye were deleted, and their online profiles on major portals in China – Sina Sports and Tencent Sport – were expunged. Six days later, in an interview with The Wall Street Journal, Hao and Ye reiterated their criticism of one-party rule in China and restated their willingness to advocate for human rights despite potential political and personal costs: "There are many people who think the same way as we do but they don't dare to speak up inside the country – and they are becoming less and less willing to speak."

Career statistics

International goals

Honours

Club
Bayi Football Team
Chinese Jia-A League: 1986
Chinese FA Cup: 1990

Dalian Shide
Chinese Jia-A League: 1997, 1998, 2000, 2001, 2002
Chinese FA Cup: 2001
Chinese Super Cup: 1996, 2000, 2002

Individual
Chinese Football Association Player of the Year: 1998
Chinese Jia-A League Team of the Year: 2001
Chinese Jia-A League Top goalscorer: 1997, 1998, 2001
IFFHS Legends

See also
 List of top international men's football goalscorers by country
 List of men's footballers with 100 or more international caps

References

External links
Hao Haidong's personal website

International stats at teamchina
Player profile at sodasoccer.com

1970 births
Living people
Association football forwards
Chinese footballers
Footballers from Qingdao
China international footballers
Chinese football managers
1992 AFC Asian Cup players
1996 AFC Asian Cup players
2002 FIFA World Cup players
2004 AFC Asian Cup players
FIFA Century Club
Bayi Football Team players
Dalian Shide F.C. players
Chinese expatriate footballers
Chinese expatriate sportspeople in the United Kingdom
Sheffield United F.C. players
Asian Games medalists in football
Footballers at the 1998 Asian Games
Asian Games bronze medalists for China
Medalists at the 1998 Asian Games